{{Infobox settlement
| name                            = Freehold Township, New Jersey
| official_name                   = Township of Freehold
| settlement_type                 = Township
| nickname                        = 
| motto                           = Western Monmouth's Family Town

| image_skyline                   = Freehold_NJ_Clark-Walker-Combs-Hartshorne-Oakley_House.jpg
| imagesize                       = 250x200px
| image_caption                   = Walker-Combs-Hartshorne Farmstead
| image_flag                      = 
| image_seal                      = Freehold Township seal.png
| seal_size                       = 175px

| image_map                       = Freehold_twp_nj_025.png
| mapsize                         = 250x200px
| map_caption                     = Map of Freehold Township in Monmouth County. Inset: Location of Monmouth County highlighted in the State of New Jersey.
| image_map1                      = Census_Bureau_map_of_Freehold_Township,_New_Jersey.png
| mapsize1                        = 250x200px
| map_caption1                    = Census Bureau map of Freehold Township, New Jersey

{
  "type": "ExternalData",
  "service": "geoshape",
  "ids": "Q1077969"
}

| pushpin_map                     = USA New Jersey Monmouth County#USA New Jersey#USA
| pushpin_label                   = Freehold Township
| pushpin_map_caption             = Location in Monmouth County##Location in New Jersey##Location in the United States
| pushpin_relief                  = yes

| subdivision_type                = Country
| subdivision_name                = 
| subdivision_type1               = State
| subdivision_name1               = 
| subdivision_type2               = County
| subdivision_name2               = Monmouth
| government_footnotes            = 
| government_type                 = Township
| governing_body                  = Township Committee
| leader_title                    = Mayor
| leader_name                     = Maureen Fasano (R, term ends December 31, 2022)
| leader_title1                   = Administrator
| leader_name1                    = Peter R. Valesi
| leader_title2                   = Municipal clerk
| leader_name2                    = Sanabel Abouzeina
| established_title               = Established
| established_date                = October 31, 1693
| established_title2              = Incorporated
| established_date2               = February 21, 1798
| named_for                       = English legal term of freehold

| unit_pref                       = Imperial
| area_footnotes                  = 
| area_magnitude                  = 
| area_total_km2                  = 100.71
| area_land_km2                   = 100.11
| area_water_km2                  =   0.59
| area_total_sq_mi                =  38.88
| area_land_sq_mi                 =  38.65
| area_water_sq_mi                =   0.23
| area_water_percent              =   0.59
| area_rank                       = 59th of 565 in state4th of 53 in county

| population_as_of                = 2020
| population_footnotes            = 
| population_total                = 35369
| population_rank                 = 67th of 565 in state5th of 53 in county
| population_density_km2          = auto
| population_density_sq_mi        = 915.0
| population_density_rank         = 393rd of 565 in state46th of 53 in county
| population_est                  = 35596
| pop_est_as_of                   = 2021
| pop_est_footnotes               = 

| timezone                        = Eastern (EST)
| utc_offset                      = −05:00
| timezone_DST                    = Eastern (EDT)
| utc_offset_DST                  = −04:00
| elevation_footnotes             = 
| elevation_m                     = 
| elevation_ft                    = 118
| coordinates_footnotes           = US Gazetteer files: 2010, 2000, and 1990, United States Census Bureau. Accessed September 4, 2014.
| coordinates                     = 
| postal_code_type                = ZIP Code
| postal_code                     = 07728Zip Codes, State of New Jersey. Accessed September 8, 2013.
| area_code                       = 732/848 and 908 (mobile)
| blank_name                      = FIPS code
| blank_info                      = 3402525230U.S. Census website , United States Census Bureau. Accessed September 4, 2014.
| blank1_name                     = GNIS feature ID
| blank1_info                     = 0882116US Board on Geographic Names, United States Geological Survey. Accessed September 4, 2014.
| website                         = 
| footnotes                       = 
}}
Freehold Township is a township in Monmouth County, in the U.S. state of New Jersey. Located in Central New Jersey and crisscrossed by several major highways, the township is known for being the regional commercial hub for Monmouth County (home to the Freehold Raceway and Freehold Raceway Mall) and as a suburban bedroom community of New York City, located within the Raritan Valley region of the much larger New York Metropolitan Area.Tarabour, Brooke. "New Jersey-Bound: The Staten Island Migration", The New York Times, January 10, 1993. Accessed June 10, 2022. Accessed September 10, 2020. As of the 2020 United States census, the township's population was 35,369, a decrease of 815 (−2.3%) from the 2010 census count of 36,184, which in turn reflected an increase of 4,647 (+14.7%) from the 31,537 counted in the 2000 census.

Freehold Township was first formed on October 31, 1693, and was incorporated as a township by an act of the New Jersey Legislature on February 21, 1798. Portions of Freehold Township were taken to form Upper Freehold Township, so some wills and official records following the split referred to "Lower Freehold Township" although the official name has always been Freehold Township.Lower Freehold Township Tax Roll July 1787. Additional portions formed Millstone Township (February 28, 1844), Jackson Township (March 6, 1844), Atlantic Township (February 18, 1847; now Colts Neck Township), Marlboro Township (February 17, 1848) and Manalapan Township (March 9, 1848). Freehold town was formed within the township on March 25, 1869, and formally separated when it was reconstituted as a borough on April 15, 1919, including additional portions of the township.

The Battle of Monmouth was fought in June 1778 in what has been preserved as Monmouth Battlefield State Park, which is in Freehold Township and Manalapan Township.

History

Early history
The Lenni Lenape Native Americans were the earliest known people to live in the area that became Freehold. The Lenape were a hunter-gatherer society. They were largely sedentary, changing campsites seasonally. They were prolific hunters of small game and birds. They were also skilled fisherman, and were known to harvest vast amounts of clams from the bays and inlets on the Jersey Shore. They also practiced some agriculture to augment their food supply. During this time, an important crossroad of two major Lenape trails was located in the area of Freehold.

In 1498, John Cabot became the first European to sight this land. By the late 17th century, the English had begun to take over the area. In 1664, the Duke of York (later James II & VII) granted a patent to Sir George Carteret to develop the area. In 1685, Scottish Presbyterians from Scotland, along with English Baptists and Quakers from New England fleeing religious persecution at home, became the first to settle within the area.Salter’s History of Monmouth and Ocean Counties New Jersey: The First Legislative Assembly in New Jersey. In 1693, along with Middletown and Shrewsbury, Freehold was established by act of legislature as one of the three original townships in Monmouth County. The name of the township comes from the word freehold, an English legal term describing fee simple property ownership.

Colonial Freehold
In 1714, when the colonial government was deciding where to locate the county seat and courthouse, Freeholder John Reid, the first Surveyor General of East Jersey, wanted the county seat located in Freehold. Reid's offer to sell the property to the Board of Chosen Freeholders at a heavily discounted price may have been the deciding factor in choosing Freehold—rather than Middletown or Shrewsbury—as the site of the county seat. As part of the deal, Reid placed a restrictive covenant in the deed that, should the property ever cease being used as a courthouse, ownership would revert to the Reid family. Direct descendants of John Reid still reside in Freehold Township.

Freehold was officially designated as the seat of the Monmouth County government, and a court house was commissioned to be built on the land purchased from John Reid. The Monmouth Courthouse opened in 1715. A small village quickly began to develop around the courthouse. At first, the village was called Monmouth Courthouse. Over time, other government buildings opened near the courthouse, including a sheriff's office, a prison, and a post office. A number of homes and commercial businesses also sprang up in the village, including a blacksmith, a general store, a bank, a hotel, and saloon. 
 
In the area surrounding Monmouth Courthouse, many successful farms began to appear. The farms in Freehold were particularly well known for the production of potatoes, beans, and rye, which were sold in the markets of nearby cities. Freehold also became known for its excellent horse farms. The differences within Freehold between the growing settlement around the courthouse and the surrounding farmland were the seeds for the eventual division of Freehold into two separate municipalities in the early 20th century.

As of 1745, the majority of families in Freehold were still Scottish immigrants. In modern Freehold, many important streets bear the name of early colonial families, including Barkalow, Applegate, Rhea, Throckmorton, and Schanck.

The Revolutionary War in Freehold

Freehold was deeply impacted by the American Revolution. In 1765 with the passage of the Stamp Act, dissidents in Middletown and Upper Freehold established Sons of Liberty groups. In late 1775, Capt. Elias Longstreet recruited the first company of colonists from the county to join the Continental Army for an ill-fated invasion of Canada. Freehold was a known center of patriot activity. The Declaration of Independence was publicly proclaimed, read aloud, from the steps of the Monmouth Courthouse just a few days after being signed in Philadelphia.

However, after British success at the Battle of Long Island, Freehold and all of Monmouth County fell under the control of Loyalists. The British government continued to operate the Monmouth Courthouse, and several people involved in revolutionary activities were arrested and tried for treason at the courthouse. The success of the Continental Army at the Battle of Trenton helped to weaken loyalist control of Freehold.

In June 1778, the British Army began a major strategic evacuation of the city of Philadelphia. They attempted to protect a long, slow moving column of loyalist families, equipment, and other supplies seized in Philadelphia, as they moved towards ships in New York Harbor. On June 28, 1778, the Continental Army intercepted the column in Freehold. The Battle of Monmouth was one of the largest battles of the Revolutionary War, involving over 25,000 soldiers combined in Continental, British, and Hessian forces.  The initial engagement was in doubt until Washington arrived because Charles Lee was retreating from the battlefield. Washington rallied the Continentals and strongly engaged the British forces and they held their ground on the battlefield. However, British forces were successful in completing their primary goal, the evacuation of Philadelphia. Both sides claimed victory in the battle.

Several famous figures from the Revolutionary War fought at the Battle of Monmouth. British forces were commanded by Sir Henry Clinton and Charles Cornwallis. The Continental Army was commanded by George Washington and Charles Lee. Charles Lee was later court martialed by the Continental Army for his actions at the Battle of Monmouth. Nathanael Greene, Alexander Hamilton, "Mad" Anthony Wayne, the Marquis de Lafayette and Friedrich Wilhelm von Steuben also fought at the Battle of Monmouth for the Continental Army. Another famous figure at the Battle of Monmouth was Molly Pitcher, who manned a cannon during the battle after her husband was wounded.

In the aftermath of the Battle of Monmouth, Loyalist control of Freehold faltered. The township ceased to have a functioning municipal government and the courthouse was closed until the end of the war. Minor clashes between loyalists and continentals flared up in town, with the violence peaking around 1780. Colonel Tye, was an escaped slave formerly named Titus, and the leader of a prominent loyalist guerrilla force, which conducted several raids in and around Freehold. In one famous incident Joshua Huddy was captured and hung by British Loyalists under the direction of Richard Lippincott and Colonel Tye. Colonel Tye later died from injuries sustained during that raid. Patriots later cut down Huddy's body hanging from the gallows and buried it in Freehold, at Old Tennent Church. At the end of the war, the community was deeply divided and nearly 120 loyalist families left Freehold, fearing retribution from their neighbors. Most of these families re-settled in Canada.

19th-century Freehold
During the early 1800s, Freehold steadily grew in size. The village around the courthouse was now called Freehold, along with the surrounding farmland. In 1852, when long distance railroad systems were first being developed, a railroad station, with trains making regular stops, was built running nearly parallel with Throckmorton Street in Freehold. Freehold soon had public sewers in the village and in some of the outlying farmland. By 1883, there was an electrical grid and a telephone switchboard, at a time when these inventions were still brand new. These public advancements caused rapid economic growth in Freehold. The village of Freehold became an important commercial and industrial hub in central New Jersey. The farms in the rest of Freehold benefited greatly by being able to sell their products more easily in New York and Philadelphia. Both the village and the farms prospered together, however the public policies sought by the two different communities continued to grow further apart. The municipal government was increasingly divided between the villagers and farmers.

In 1824, the American Hotel opened on Main Street in Freehold. It is still standing today and is one of the oldest buildings in Freehold. In 1853, the Freehold Raceway opened. Though the original grandstand burned down in a fire, the racetrack is still open today, and is one of the oldest harness racetracks in America. The Great Fire of Freehold happened on October 30, 1873. The fire reportedly began in a commercial building on Main Street. It soon spread to engulf a large section of the village, and many wooden buildings, including Monmouth Courthouse, were burned down.

Freehold also has a relatively forgotten but important place in the history of the bicycle. Cycling champion Arthur Augustus Zimmerman resided in the town during his racing career in the 1880s and 1890s, and from 1896 to 1899 operated the Zimmerman Bicycle Co.; the company's bicycles were known as the "Zimmy." Today, Freehold Borough is home to  the Metz Bicycle Museum, where the only extant "Zimmy" can be seen.

Freehold divided
At the beginning of the 20th century, Freehold was an increasingly divided community. The issue of local tax dollars, used as funding for public works and infrastructure projects, was the primary point of contention. The Freeholders living in the downtown area, around the courthouse had very different ideas about how to spend public money compared to the Freeholders living in the surrounding farmland. Tension within the community increased greatly in 1916 when a severe polio epidemic swept through Freehold. After contentious public debate, a referendum was held to on the future of Freehold, and voters overwhelmingly decided to split the town into two separate municipalities.

On April 15, 1919, Freehold Borough formally separated from Freehold Township. Freeholders generally refer to the different municipalities simply as Borough and Township. Borough, the downtown area around the courthouse, retained all the existing government buildings around Court Street and Main Street. Borough also kept the designation as county seat. Freehold Township, the farming communities that surrounded the courthouse, set up a new town hall complex on Schanck Road. Township completely encircles the Borough. On September 7, 1926, Freehold Borough annexed additional territory from the Township.

The Township in the 20th century

In the early 20th century, the farms in Freehold Township continued to be prosperous and successful, and the area steadily grew in population. However, after World War II, the Township experienced rapid growth. By this time, transportation systems had increased to a point to allow workers to commute daily to jobs in larger cities, such as Newark, Philadelphia, and New York City. Highways, including U.S. Route 9 and Route 33 helped to make it possible for commuters to live in Freehold and work in nearby cities. The township quickly developed large neighborhoods of suburban single family homes.

Soon, the Township began to grow commercial and industrial businesses that rivalled the Borough. Brockway Glass built their initial facility off Center Street in 1955 with additional facilities added in 1956, 1967, 1969 & 1976 and ceased operations in 1991.Lockhart, Bill, et al. Brockway Machine Bottle Co. and Brockway Glass Co., Society for Historical Archaeology. Accessed March 14, 2022. The site is now operated by Iron Mountain. 3M opened a magnetic tape production facility in 1957. In 1971, a major medical complex, originally called Freehold Area Hospital, and today called CentraState Medical Center, opened in the Township, a regional hospital for communities in western Monmouth County and southern Middlesex County. Not all industrial developments in the Township were positive. In 1983, the United States Environmental Protection Agency designated the Lone Pine Chemical Site in the Township as a Superfund site. The site has been called "one of the worst environmental disasters in the country". Based on the latest EPA five-year review in 2019, remediation work has contained the spill. In 1990, with the opening of Freehold Raceway Mall, the second-largest mall in the state, the Township had solidified in being a premier commercial center for Central New Jersey.

As the Township grew, Route 33, which ran through the heart of Freehold, became increasingly congested, in which studies suggested the construction of a new freeway. This was due to the fact that there was no room to widen the highway to 4 lanes between Route 9 and a railroad bridge at the eastern end would need to have been widened to accommodate 4 lanes. After several years, the new freeway was downsized to merely a bypass of Freehold. Construction from near Sweetmans Lane (CR 527) to U.S. Route 9 was finished in 1972. Eventually construction began again and the bypass was extended to Halls Mill Road in 1989. For decades traffic was detoured, and congestion continued to worsen. The delay was lengthened when an endangered species was found in the path of the proposed roadway. Finally, after 32 years of waiting, the bypass was fully completed in January 2003, reducing congestion on Route 33 and Route 33 Business, albeit not a completely 4 lane highway between Halls Mills Road and the Howell Road intersection.Staff. "32 years later ...", Asbury Park Press, January 18, 2003. Accessed December 4, 2012. "IT took nearly 32 years to complete the Route 33 Freehold bypass, opened yesterday."

The Township has thousands of jobs located within the municipality, along with a growing numbers of commuters who work in neighboring cities such as New York City, Newark, Trenton, and Philadelphia. Five residents of the Township died in the September 11, 2001, terrorist attack on the World Trade Center and are listed on the county's 9/11 memorial.

The COVID-19 pandemic, like many communities, affected Freehold Township. Early in the pandemic, the township (and county at large) made news for the numbers of cases that were being reported. In particular, one Freehold family named the Fuscos had made news for having lost five of their relatives during the first few months of the pandemic, with 19 other family members coming into contact with the virus.Tully, Tracey. "Coronavirus Ravages 7 Members of a Single Family, Killing 4", The New York Times, March 18, 2020. Accessed August 14, 2021. As of March 1, 2021, the township had reported 2,793 positive COVID-19 cases, with Monmouth County as a whole ranked fourth in the state for new COVID-19 cases. The township implemented protocols in an attempt to slowing down the spread of the virus, by providing support to local citizens, businesses, and services. The township's health department has implemented an intricate contact tracing system for Freehold Township residents. On May 26, 2020, the township adopted an ordinance to help in simplifying the process for restaurant owners to obtain permits for seasonal outdoor dining. As of June 25, 2021, the township and county has been ahead of the Biden Administration's Coronavirus vaccine goal, with at least 73.5% of adults receiving at least one dose, compared to the national average of 65.6% of adults receiving at least one dose.

Geography

According to the United States Census Bureau, the township had a total area of 38.88 square miles (100.71 km2), including 38.65 square miles (100.11 km2) of land and 0.23 square miles (0.59 km2) of water (0.59%).

The township completely surrounds the borough of Freehold, making it part of 21 pairs of "doughnut towns" in the state, where one municipality entirely surrounds another. The township borders Colts Neck Township, Howell Township, Manalapan Township, Marlboro Township and Millstone Township in Monmouth County; and Jackson Township in Ocean County.Regional Location Map, Monmouth County, New Jersey. Accessed March 29, 2020. The municipality of Upper Freehold Township is not connected, geographically or politically, to Freehold Township.

East Freehold (2010 Census population of 4,894) and West Freehold (13,613 as of 2010) are unincorporated communities and census-designated places located within Freehold Township.New Jersey: 2010 – Population and Housing Unit Counts – 2010 Census of Population and Housing (CPH-2-32), United States Census Bureau, August 2012. Accessed July 13, 2016.

Other unincorporated communities, localities and place names located partially or completely within the township include Blue Ball (now Adelphia), Burlington Heights, Georgia, Monmouth Heights, Orchard Estates, Siloam, Smithburg, Southburg, Stonehurst East and Stonehurst West.

The township is one of two municipalities in Monmouth County that are part of the Toms River watershed, most of which is located in Ocean County.

Ecology
According to the A. W. Kuchler U.S. potential natural vegetation types, Freehold Township would have an Appalachian oak (104) vegetation type with an Eastern hardwood forest (25) vegetation form.

Major bodies of water
Due to the township's location in New Jersey, it is the home of numerous headwaters for various important rivers, brooks, and streams that flow throughout the state. The township is located on a ridge within the geographic heartland of New Jersey,"Where are the headwaters of Manalapan Brook?", My Central Jersey, January 2, 2015. Accessed September 21, 2020.New Jersey Geology 1940, Rutgers Cartography. Accessed September 24, 2020. as most sections of the township fall within the hillier terrain and fertile soil found in the Inner coastal plain, while the southeastern sections of the township fall within the more flat terrain and sandier soil found in the Outer coastal plain.

The township is located within the much larger Raritan Valley region (as many of its brooks and streams flow into the aforementioned river), while also being located relatively close to the Raritan Bay. The township also encompasses some of the northernmost stretches of the Pine Barrens. Notable bodies of water within the township include:

Lakes

Lake Topanemus
Turkey Swamp

Rivers
Barnegat Bay Watershed
Metedeconk River
North Branch Metedeconk River
South Branch Metedeconk River
Toms River
Raritan Basin Watershed
Manasquan Riverhttps://water.rutgers.edu/Presentations-FixingFlooding/AM_TractC_NJRainGardenRebateProgram_SaraMellor.pdf Rutgers State University. New Jersey Rain Garden Rebate Program: Fostering the Adoption of Stormwater Management Practices. Raritan River Basin. February 26, 2016. Accessed March 14, 2021.
Applegate Creek
Burkes Creek
Debois Creek
South RiverSubwatersheds Lower Raritan Watershed Partnership. Accessed September 21, 2020.
Manalapan Brook
Matchaponix Brook
McGellairds Brook
Tepehemus Brook
Weamaconk Creek
Wemrock Brook
Navesink River Watershed
Swimming River"The Navesink Watershed A Short History". As Interpreted in 2003 by Kate Keelen and Jerry Keelen. Navesink Swimming River Group A Subwatershed Regional Council of the Monmouth Coastal Watersheds Partnership. pg. 2, pg. 3, pg. 4.
Yellow Brook

Climate
According to the Köppen climate classification system, Freehold Township sits on the northern border between the humid subtropical climate (Cfa) zone and the humid continental climate (Dfa) zone, with the township being one of the most northern localities in North America that has a humid subtropical climate. Cfa climates are characterized by all months having an average temperature > , at least four months with an average temperature ≥ , at least one month with an average temperature ≥  and no significant precipitation difference between seasons.

Demographics

2010 census

The Census Bureau's 2006–2010 American Community Survey showed that (in 2010 inflation-adjusted dollars) median household income was $94,735 (with a margin of error of +/− $5,749) and the median family income was $112,094 (+/− $4,124). Males had a median income of $85,099 (+/− $6,540) versus $48,926 (+/− $4,407) for females. The per capita income for the township was $40,504 (+/− $2,006). About 2.8% of families and 3.9% of the population were below the poverty line, including 4.6% of those under age 18 and 4.0% of those age 65 or over.

2000 census
As of the 2000 United States census there were 31,537 people, 10,814 households, and 8,283 families residing in the township. The population density was 820.2 people per square mile (316.7/km2). There were 11,032 housing units at an average density of 286.9 per square mile (110.8/km2). The racial makeup of the township was 87.09% White, 5.12% African American, 0.14% Native American, 5.15% Asian, 0.02% Pacific Islander, 1.19% from other races, and 1.30% from two or more races. Hispanic or Latino of any race were 5.19% of the population.DP-1: Profile of General Demographic Characteristics: 2000 – Census 2000 Summary File 1 (SF 1) 100-Percent Data for Freehold township, Monmouth County, New Jersey , United States Census Bureau. Accessed December 4, 2012.

There were 10,814 households, out of which 37.8% had children under the age of 18 living with them, 65.9% were married couples living together, 8.0% had a female householder with no husband present, and 23.4% were non-families. 20.0% of all households were made up of individuals, and 7.7% had someone living alone who was 65 years of age or older. The average household size was 2.76 and the average family size was 3.21.

In the township the population was spread out, with 25.3% under the age of 18, 6.1% from 18 to 24, 31.2% from 25 to 44, 25.5% from 45 to 64, and 12.0% who were 65 years of age or older. The median age was 38 years. For every 100 females, there were 97.7 males. For every 100 females age 18 and over, there were 95.3 males.

The median income for a household in the township was $77,185, and the median income for a family was $89,845. Males had a median income of $62,545 versus $36,668 for females. The per capita income for the township was $31,505. About 2.8% of families and 3.9% of the population were below the poverty line, including 4.8% of those under age 18 and 5.1% of those age 65 or over.

Economy
Due to suburbanization within the township, its location near the Jersey Shore, along with its proximity to major cities such as New York, Newark, Trenton, and Philadelphia, the township has been a longtime economic center in the Central Jersey region.Kennedy, Shawn G. "Real Estate; In Freehold, More Than Just Homes", The New York Times, July 1, 1987. Accessed December 1, 2020.Garbarine, Rachelle. "In The Region: New Jersey; Freehold Is Getting Its First Major Mall", The New York Times, March 25, 1990. Accessed May 9, 2021. "Strip centers have sprung up along the highways and work is nearing completion on the township's first major shopping complex, the Freehold Raceway Mall. It will have 1.3 million square feet of space in 200 shops and food outlets, as many as five department stores and parking for 6,500 cars. The mall is being built by the Wilmorite Corporation of Rochester on a 176-acre site in the south central corner of the township along Route 9 at its intersection with Routes 33 and 537. The $125 million project is scheduled to open Aug. 1."

Agriculture

Despite suburbanization in recent decades, the township's agricultural roots have still been preserved. There are numerous crop farms, thoroughbred farms, sod farms, nurseries, and orchards in the township. Notable farms in the township include Brock Farms, Battleview Orchards, Clayton Family Farm, Crawford Farms, the historic Oakley Farm, Reid Sod Farm, and Wemrock Orchards.

Tomasello Winery (originally based in Hammonton) has a wine tasting room located in Wemrock Orchards.DiUlio, Nick. "A Taste of Old-World Charm" in New Jersey Monthly (April 11, 2011). Retrieved May 19, 2013. The winery offers over 50 homegrown wines for tasting sessions (reservations strongly encouraged), but the winery is also open to retail transactions of their stocked wine.https://tomasellowinery.com/tastingmenu/ . Tomasello Winery: Wine Menu. Accessed January 17, 2022. There are other wineries that are nearby to the township, including Four JG's Orchards & Vineyards in Colts Neck, Cream Ridge Winery in Cream Ridge, Working Dog Winery in Robbinsville, and Hopewell Valley Vineyards in Hopewell.

Commerce

Established in 1853, making it the nation's oldest half-mile harness racing track, Freehold Raceway offers horse lovers and bettors an opportunity to see harness racing.

Outside of the Freehold Raceway Mall, the township itself has many other shopping malls and plazas. Diane & Co. is a dress shop that has been featured on the Oxygen Network's show Jersey Couture.

iPlay America is an indoor family entertainment and event center that opened in November 2011, offering rides, arcade and carnival games, along with Topgolf, music venues, laser tag, shops, bars, and restaurants.Hours & Location, iPlay America. Accessed June 18, 2015.

Main Street
Freehold Borough (which the township surrounds) is home to Downtown Freehold, located on East and West Main Street (County Route 537). This downtown section has various eateries, bars, boutiques, historical sites, and other excursions. Within this section of town, there have been plans to revitalize the downtown area, as outlined in the Freehold Center Core Revitalization Plan (2008),Ordinance No. 2013/13, Borough of Freehold. Accessed September 30, 2020. in which NJ Transit has sponsored a project in transforming the Freehold Center Bus Station into a Transit Village. This new designation would foster in the creation of a transit-oriented development zoning district around by the Freehold Center Bus Station between West Main Street (County Route 537) and Throckmorton Street (County Route 522). This would have a huge positive impact to the Freehold area economy.

There are many other shopping destinations right outside of the Freeholds region, including the Manalapan EpiCentre (formerly, the Manalapan Mall) in Manalapan Township, the Jackson Premium Outlets in Jackson Township, and The Shoppes in Old Bridge Township.

Manufacturing
Freehold Township and Borough began to grow in commercial and industrial manufacturing of goods during the late 19th and early 20th centuries. Among most prominent of companies that began doing operations in the township was the Brockway Glass Company, which had built a facility on Center Street in 1955. Brockway Glass then proceeded to build additional facilities in the region in 1956, 1967, 1969 & 1976. The company ceased operations in the township in 1991, in which the site is now operated by the Freehold campus location for Iron Mountain, an enterprise information management services company.

Nestle opened a production plant in 1948, which is still in operation and has expanded its operations in logistics and engineering. 3M opened a magnetic tape production facility in 1957.

Sports

In 2016, Freehold Township Little League 12u baseball team won the New Jersey state championship and made it to the Mid-Atlantic Regional Tournament, the first team from the township to take the state title since 2003. In 2017 , Freehold Township Little League 13U baseball intermediate division won the United States Championship in the Little League Intermediate World Series tournament defeating Wailuku, Hawaii 6-4 in Livermore, California.

In 2004, the Freehold Township Senior League baseball team won the Senior League World Series. Led by manager Mike Brach of Freehold Township, the team became the first from Freehold Township to make it to the World Series, let alone win it.

Parks and recreation

Monmouth Battlefield State Park, Turkey Swamp Park, Lake Topanemus, and Michael J. Tighe Park (formerly known as Liberty Oak Park) are all located within the township and provide assorted recreational opportunities. Smaller parks in the township include Durand Park, Whittier Oaks Park, Opatut Park, Wynnefield Park, Stonehurst Park, Sandy Brook Park, Duchess Court Park, Greentree Park, Medford Park, Woodgate Park, Woodcrest Park, Orchard Hills Park and Sargent Park.

The southernmost segment of the Henry Hudson Trail starts in Freehold Borough and runs northeast through the township, to the Raritan Bayshore region. The parking area is located at 119 Dutch Lane Road in the township and is used by walkers, runners and bicyclists.

Michael J. Tighe Park was formerly known as Liberty Oak Park, the park having been renamed in 2001.

 Government 

 Local government 
Freehold Township is governed under the Township form of New Jersey municipal government, one of 141 municipalities (of the 564) statewide that use this form, the second-most commonly used form of government in the state. The Township Committee is comprised of five members, who are elected directly by the voters at-large in partisan elections to serve three-year terms of office on a staggered basis, with either one or two seats coming up for election each year as part of the November general election in a three-year cycle."Forms of Municipal Government in New Jersey", p. 7. Rutgers University Center for Government Studies. Accessed July 13, 2016. At an annual reorganization meeting, the Township Committee selects one of its members to serve as Mayor and another as Deputy Mayor.

The Township Committee enacts local ordinances, levies municipal taxes and conducts the affairs of the township. In almost all cases, it can review and approve the actions of other Freehold Township boards, committees and agencies. The Township Committee conducts all of its business during monthly meetings open to the public.

, the members of the Township Committee are Mayor Maureen Fasano (R, term on committee and as mayor ends December 31, 2022), Deputy Mayor Alan C. Walker (R, term on committee ends 2023; term as deputy mayor ends 2022), Anthony J. Ammiano (R, 2024), Thomas L. Cook (R, 2024) and Lester A. Preston Jr. (R, 2023).2022 Municipal Data Sheet, Township of Freehold. Accessed April 20, 2022.November 3, 2020 General Election Official Results, Monmouth County, New Jersey, updated November 3, 2020. Accessed January 1, 2021.

In January 2020, the Township Committee appointed Alan C. Walker to fill the seat expiring in December 2020 that had become vacant following the resignation of David M. Salkin.

 Federal, state, and county representation 
Freehold Township is located in the 3rd and 4th Congressional Districts and is part of New Jersey's 11th state legislative district.2019 New Jersey Citizen's Guide to Government, New Jersey League of Women Voters. Accessed October 30, 2019. 

Prior to the 2011 reapportionment following the 2010 Census, Freehold Township had been in the 12th state legislative district.

  

Monmouth County is governed by a Board of County Commissioners comprised of five members who are elected at-large to serve three year terms of office on a staggered basis, with either one or two seats up for election each year as part of the November general election. At an annual reorganization meeting held in the beginning of January, the board selects one of its members to serve as Director and another as Deputy Director. , Monmouth County's Commissioners are
Commissioner Director Thomas A. Arnone (R, Neptune City, term as commissioner and as director ends December 31, 2022), 
Commissioner Deputy Director Susan M. Kiley (R, Hazlet Township, term as commissioner ends December 31, 2024; term as deputy commissioner director ends 2022),
Lillian G. Burry (R, Colts Neck Township, 2023),
Nick DiRocco (R, Wall Township, 2022), and 
Ross F. Licitra (R, Marlboro Township, 2023).Board of County Commissioners, Monmouth County, New Jersey. Accessed July 19, 2022. 
Constitutional officers elected on a countywide basis are
County clerk Christine Giordano Hanlon (R, 2025; Ocean Township),Members List:Clerks, Constitutional Officers Association of New Jersey. Accessed July 19, 2022. 
Sheriff Shaun Golden (R, 2022; Howell Township)Members List: Sheriffs, Constitutional Officers Association of New Jersey. Accessed July 19, 2022. and 
Surrogate Rosemarie D. Peters (R, 2026; Middletown Township).Members List: Surrogates, Constitutional Officers Association of New Jersey. Accessed July 19, 2022.

Politics
As of March 23, 2011, there were a total of 23,033 registered voters in Freehold Township, of which 5,014 (21.8%) were registered as Democrats, 5,058 (22.0%) were registered as Republicans and 12,949 (56.2%) were registered as Unaffiliated. There were 12 voters registered as Libertarians or Greens.

In the 2016 presidential election, Republican Donald Trump received 55.6% of the vote (9,972 cast), ahead of Democrat Hillary Clinton with 41.3% (7,410 votes), and other candidates with 3.1% (560 votes), among the 17,942 ballots cast by the township's voters. In the 2012 presidential election, Republican Mitt Romney received 55.3% of the vote (9,204 cast), ahead of Democrat Barack Obama with 43.5% (7,242 votes), and other candidates with 1.2% (192 votes), among the 16,715 ballots cast by the township's 23,974 registered voters (77 ballots were spoiled), for a turnout of 69.7%. In the 2008 presidential election, Republican John McCain received 53.5% of the vote (9,480 cast), ahead of Democrat Barack Obama with 44.2% (7,845 votes) and other candidates with 1.0% (185 votes), among the 17,733 ballots cast by the township's 23,935 registered voters, for a turnout of 74.1%. In the 2004 presidential election, Republican George W. Bush received 56.6% of the vote (9,260 ballots cast), outpolling Democrat John Kerry with 42.2% (6,915 votes) and other candidates with 0.6% (131 votes), among the 16,373 ballots cast by the township's 22,061 registered voters, for a turnout percentage of 74.2.

In the 2017 gubernatorial election, Republican Kim Guadagno received 57.7% of the vote (6,060 cast), ahead of Democrat Phil Murphy with 40.4% (4,246 votes). In the 2013 gubernatorial election, Republican Chris Christie received 72.2% of the vote (7,009 cast), ahead of Democrat Barbara Buono with 26.0% (2,525 votes), and other candidates with 1.8% (175 votes), among the 9,826 ballots cast by the township's 24,098 registered voters (117 ballots were spoiled), for a turnout of 40.8%. In the 2009 gubernatorial election, Republican Chris Christie received 65.5% of the vote (7,900 ballots cast), ahead of Democrat Jon Corzine with 27.5% (3,317 votes), Independent Chris Daggett with 5.7% (688 votes) and other candidates with 0.8% (96 votes), among the 12,058 ballots cast by the township's 23,343 registered voters, yielding a 51.7% turnout.

 Education 

Public school students in pre-kindergarten through eighth grade are educated by the Freehold Township Schools. As of the 2018–19 school year, the district, comprised of eight schools, had an enrollment of 3,737 students and 329.6 classroom teachers (on an FTE basis), for a student–teacher ratio of 11.3:1. Schools in the district (with 2018–19 enrollment data from the National Center for Education Statistics) are 
Early Childhood Learning Center (97 students; in grades Pre-K), 
C. Richard Applegate School (424; K–5), 
Joseph J. Catena School (488; K–5), 
Laura Donovan School (436; K–5), 
Marshall W. Errickson School (435; K–5), 
West Freehold School (501; K–5), 
Clifton T. Barkalow School (661; 6–8) and 
Dwight D. Eisenhower Middle School (686; 6–8).New Jersey School Directory for Freehold Township Schools, New Jersey Department of Education. Accessed December 29, 2016.

Students in ninth through twelfth grades attend either Freehold Township High School or Freehold High School (based on home address), as part of the Freehold Regional High School District (FRHSD) The district also serves students from Colts Neck Township, Englishtown, Farmingdale, Freehold Borough, Howell Township, Manalapan Township and Marlboro Township.Comprehensive Annual Financial Report for Freehold Regional High School District, New Jersey Department of Education, June 30, 2019. Accessed May 31, 2020. "Geographically, the District is  the Townships of Colts Neck, Freehold, Howell, Manalapan and Marlboro and the Boroughs of Englishtown, Farmingdale and Freehold. Established in 1953, the District's total area is 198 square miles. As of the October 2019 student count, there were 10,587 resident students." Freehold Township High School is home to the Contemporary Global Studies Learning Center, the Animal and Botanical Program, and the International Bachloriate program. Freehold High School hosts the Medical Sciences Program, Computer Science Program, and Culinary Program. Each program admits students on a selective basis from all over the Freehold Regional High School District. of the 2018–19 school year, Freehold Township High School had an enrollment of 2,043 students and 137.3 classroom teachers (on an FTE basis), for a student–teacher ratio of 14.9:1, while Freehold Borough High School had an enrollment of 1,422 students and 103.8 classroom teachers (on an FTE basis), for a student–teacher ratio of 13.7:1. The FRHSD board of education has nine members, who are elected to three-year terms from each of the constituent districts. Each member is allocated a fraction of a vote that totals to nine points, with Freehold Township allocated one member, who has 1.4 votes.

High school students in Freehold Township have the opportunity of attending vocational schools such as Biotechnology High School, High Technology High School, the Marine Academy of Science and Technology, Communications High School, and the Academy of Allied Health & Science, which are part of the Monmouth County Vocational School District, which are available to all students in Monmouth County on a selective basis.

Rutgers University, in partnership with Brookdale Community College offers several bachelor's degree completion programs at Brookdale's Freehold Campus.

Infrastructure

Public safety

Emergency services
Freehold Township offers different departments of varying emergency services. The following are the emergency service departments in Freehold Township:

Police
The Freehold Township police department is composed of a large force that handles three major divisions; patrol, investigation, and services. The current Chief of Police is George Baumann, who started in this position in January 2020, following the retirement of former Police Chief Ernest Schriefer.https://web.archive.org/web/20200222012639/https://twp.freehold.nj.us/police , Freehold Township Police Department (February 22, 2020). Accessed October 2, 2021. Ernest Schriefer had served as Police Chief for nearly 20 years at the time of his retirement.

Fire Prevention
The township offers various fire prevention programs for Freehold Township residents.

Fire prevention courses
Freehold Township offers programs designed to prepare children on the importance of fire safety. These courses are engaging with students and are offered at Township schools and other municipal buildings.

Fire squads
Freehold Township has two volunteer fire companies:

West Freehold 
 Freehold Township Independent Fire Company #1 is located on Stillwells Corner Road in West Freehold. It was established in 1964 to provide fire protection services across Freehold Township.
Freehold Township Fire Company No. 1 Station No. 2 in Smithburg
Freehold Township Independent Fire Company No. 1 Station No. 3 in Georgia
East Freehold 
 East Freehold Fire Company (founded 1972) is located on Kozloski Road in East Freehold

First aid squads
Freehold EMS (founded 1941) is located in Freehold Borough and offers pre-hospital care to residents of both the borough and the township.

Transportation
Roads and highways

Several major roads pass through the township. Major state routes include US Route 9, Route 18, Route 33 (also known as the Freehold Bypass), and Route 79. Major county routes that pass through are County Route 522, 524, 527, and 537.

Access to Interstate 195 is available in neighboring Howell via Route 9 or Jackson via CR 537.  The Garden State Parkway entrance at exit 100 is about ten miles east on Route 33 in Tinton Falls. The New Jersey Turnpike entrance at exit 8 is about ten miles west on Route 33 in East Windsor.

Public transportation
Rail
In the 19th & 20th centuries, Freehold Borough and Freehold Township had two major railways. One major railway in the area was the Freehold and Jamesburg Agricultural Railroad, which was owned and operated by the Camden & Amboy Railroad Company (C&A). Surveying for the line began on September 8, 1851, grading began on October 19, 1852, and the first track was laid on April 4, 1853. The first section of line was opened on July 18, 1853. The establishment of the Freehold & Jamesburg Agricultural Railroad helped make the Freeholds a transportation hub. The other major railway in the area was the Central Railroad of New Jersey, which had a branch that connected the still-active former Penn Central line from Jamesburg to CNJ's Seashore Branch and the New York and Long Branch line (now owned by NJ Transit) at Matawan.

The Freehold and Jamesburg Railroad was abandoned by the early 1930s. A  portion of the former railroad's right-of-way was later approved to be sold by the New Jersey Board of Public Utility Commissioners (PUC) to Jersey Central Power & Light Company in 1966, with occasional freight service still being used through the Freehold Industrial Track. Meanwhile, The Central Railroad of New Jersey went into bankruptcy in the early 1970s and entered into Conrail on April 1, 1976, with its freight service on the rails from Freehold to Matawan being terminated in 1979 (the rails were removed in 1980). Today, it is mostly a rail-trail, converting into the Henry Hudson Trail.

The Monmouth Ocean Middlesex Line is a proposal by New Jersey Transit to restore passenger railway service to the region, by using the same tracks as the Freehold Industrial Track. The township and its neighboring borough would be potential stops for the 'MOM' Line.

As of now, the nearest train stations to the township are located in Aberdeen-Matawan, Asbury Park, and Long Branch on the North Jersey Coast Line, and Metropark in Iselin, New Brunswick, and Princeton Junction on the Northeast Corridor Line.

Buses
NJ Transit provides bus service to communities along US Route 9 from Lakewood Township to Old Bridge Township, and to the Port Authority Bus Terminal in New York City via bus routes 131, 135 and 139, to Newark Liberty International Airport and the City of Newark at large on the 67 route, to Jersey City on the 64 and 67, as well as to Six Flags Great Adventure and shopping via local service on the 833, 836 and 307 routes. Bus service is available from Route 9 to Wall Street in New York's Financial District via the  Academy Bus Line.

Bus service is available to Philadelphia from Freehold Township via transfer in Lakewood. There are several bus stops to the points listed above located along Route 9 in the township. Freehold Township has two commuter parking lots available only to township residents, which are located at the Freehold Mall Shopping Center and on Schibanoff Lane.

Aviation
Following the closure of the Marlboro Airport, Old Bridge Airport in Old Bridge and Monmouth Executive Airport in Farmingdale supply short-distance flights to surrounding areas and are the closest air transportation services. Accessed July 28, 2022.

Ferry
Ferry service is available through the SeaStreak service in Highlands, a trip that involves about a 25–30-minute drive from the eastern section of Freehold Township to reach the departing terminal. SeaStreak offers ferry service to New York City with trips to Pier 11 (on the East River at Wall Street) and 35th Street in Manhattan.

Healthcare
CentraState Medical Center is a regional hospital located in the township. Serving parts of Monmouth, Ocean, Middlesex, and Mercer counties in central New Jersey, the hospital is a partner of Atlantic Health System and is affiliated with Rutgers Robert Wood Johnson Medical School.https://rwjms.rutgers.edu/patient-care/affiliated-hospitals , Rutgers Robert Wood Johnson Medical School: Patient Care. Affiliated Hospitals. Accessed January 30, 2022. The facility has 287 beds and is part of CentraState Healthcare System, the county's fourth-largest employer. Other regional hospitals near the township include the Lakewood division of Monmouth Medical Center and the Old Bridge division of Raritan Bay Medical Center.

The closest major university hospitals to the township are Jersey Shore University Medical Center in Neptune Township, Penn Medicine Princeton Medical Center in Plainsboro Township, and Saint Peter's University Hospital and Robert Wood Johnson University Hospital in New Brunswick.

Points of interest
 CentraState Medical Center – A regional hospital for western Monmouth County.
 Freehold Raceway – One of the oldest harness racing tracks in the country.
 Freehold Raceway Mall – The second-largest mall in the state.
 Maplewood Cemetery – New Jersey Governors Joel Parker and Joseph D. Bedle, as well as several officers who served in the Civil War are interred here.
Monmouth Battlefield – This historic park preserves where the Battle of Monmouth was fought.
Turkey Swamp Park – A 1,180-acre (4.78 km2) nature preserve in the northernmost swaths of the Pine Barrens.
Village of West Freehold – Historic village in the western portion of the township, at the intersection of County Route 537 (Monmouth Road) and Stillwells Corner Road/Wemrock Road.
Jewish Heritage Museum of Monmouth County – Highlights history of Jewish residents and culture in Monmouth County

Notable people

People who were born in, residents of, or otherwise closely associated with Freehold Township include:

 Amanda Anisimova (born 2001), professional tennis player
 Jake Areman (born 1996), soccer player who plays for the Tampa Bay Rowdies in the USL Championship.
 Danny Bohn (born 1988), NASCAR Gander Outdoors Truck Series driver
 Brad Brach (born 1986), professional baseball playerDiComo, Anthony; and Langs, Sarah. "Brach joins Mets, says 'the fit's really good here'", Major League Baseball, August 9, 2019. "In a low-risk gamble to improve their bullpen, the Mets on Thursday signed veteran right-hander Brad Brach to a Major League deal. Brach, a Freehold, N.J., native and Monmouth University alumnus, was a Mets fan in his youth and even attended the 2015 World Series after the Orioles were eliminated earlier that season."
 Brian Brikowski (born 1989), defensive end who played in the Canadian Football League with the Montreal Alouettes
 Dave Cantin (born 1979), entrepreneur
 Danielle Colaprico (born 1992), midfielder for the Chicago Red Stars of the National Women's Soccer LeagueDanielle Colaprico, Chicago Red Stars. Accessed June 7, 2016.
 Joe Dailey, American football coach who is the wide receivers coach for the Carolina Panthers
 Katie Dippold, comedy writer, actress, and improvisational comedian who has co-produced and written for Parks and Recreation Joann Downey (born 1966), politician representing the 11th Legislative District in the New Jersey General Assembly
 Clare Farragher (born 1941), member of the New Jersey General Assembly from 1988 to 2002 who also served as mayor of Freehold Township
 Michele Fitzgerald (born 1990), winner of Survivor: Kaôh Rōng in 2016, the 32nd season of the reality series Survivor
 Lindsey Gallo (born 1981), former track and field athlete who competed in middle-distance events
 Milton Goode (born 1960), high jumper who participated at the 1984 Summer Olympics
 Vin Gopal (born 1985), politician who will take office in January 2018 to represent the 11th Legislative District in the New Jersey Senate, which covers portions of Monmouth County
 Robert Griswold (born 1996),swimmer
 Thomas Henderson (1743–1824), acting Governor of New Jersey
 William Barberie Howell (1865–1927), Chief Justice of the United States Customs Court
 Dan Lewis (1936–2015), American football halfback / fullback who played in the NFL for the Detroit Lions, Washington Redskins and New York Giants
 Caren Lissner (born 1972), novelist
 Paulie Litt (born 1995), actor and producer, best known for his role as Justin Shanowski on the sitcom Hope & Faith Val Majewski (born 1981), center fielder who played for the Baltimore Orioles
 Catello Manzi (born 1950), harness racing driver
 Rebecca Metz, actress known for her role as Tressa on the FX television comedy-drama series Better Things Joel Parker (1816–1888), politician, who served as the 20th Governor of New Jersey from 1863 to 1866, and again from 1872 to 1875
 Kal Penn (born 1977), actor of Harold & Kumar Go to White Castle Charles Richman, former commissioner of the New Jersey Department of Community Affairs
 William Cortenus Schenck (1773–1821), founder of Newark, Ohio, member of the Ohio Senate from 1803 to 1804.
 Peter Schrager (born 1982), sportscaster on Fox Sports and NFL Network
 John A. Scudder (1759–1836), U.S. Representative from New Jersey
 Jaime Primak Sullivan (born ), reality television star of Jersey Belle''
 John C. Ten Eyck (1814–1879), United States Senator from New Jersey from 1859 to 1865
 William H. Vredenburgh (1840–1920), attorney and public figure who served for nearly 20 years as a judge of the New Jersey Court of Errors and Appeals
 Emily Wold (born 1994), former field hockey player, who played as a midfielder

See also
 Adelphia, New Jersey
 Burlington Heights, New Jersey
 East Freehold, New Jersey
 West Freehold, New Jersey
 Freehold Borough, New Jersey
 Georgia, New Jersey
 Smithburg, New Jersey
 Upper Freehold Township, New Jersey

References

Sources
 Adelberg, Michael S. The American Revolution in Monmouth County:The Theatre of Spoil and Destruction, The History Press, 2010. 
 Pepe, Barbara. Freehold: A Home Town History, Arcadia Publishing; Charleston, SC; 2003. .

External links

 
1693 establishments in New Jersey
Populated places established in 1693
Township form of New Jersey government
Townships in Monmouth County, New Jersey